Modern English Bible translations consists of English Bible translations developed and published throughout the late modern period to the present.

A multitude of recent attempts have been made to translate the Bible into English. Most modern translations published since  are based on recently published critical editions of the original Hebrew and Greek texts. These translations typically rely on the Biblia Hebraica Stuttgartensia / Biblia Hebraica Quinta, counterparted by the Novum Testamentum Graece (and the Greek New Testament, published by the United Bible Societies, which contains the same text).

With regard to the use of Bible translations among biblical scholarship, the New Revised Standard Version is used broadly, but the English Standard Version is emerging as a primary text of choice among biblical scholars and theologians inclined toward theological conservatism.

Development of Modern English Bible versions 

The Wessex Gospels were the first translation of the four Gospels in English without accompanying Latin text. The Authorized King James Version of 1611 was sporadically altered until 1769, but was not thoroughly updated until the creation of the Revised Version in 1885; it was not until the Revised Standard Version of 1952 (New Testament in 1946) that a rival to the KJV was composed, nearly 350 years after the KJV was first published. The RSV gained widespread adoption among the mainstream Protestant Churches in America and a Catholic Edition was released in 1962.  It was updated as the New Revised Standard Version in 1989.

In the late twentieth century, Bibles increasingly appeared that were much less literal in their approach to translation. In 1946, the New English Bible was initiated in the United Kingdom, intended to enable readers to better understand the King James Bible. In 1958, J. B. Phillips (1906–1982) produced an edition of the New Testament letters in paraphrase, the Letters to Young Churches, so that members of his youth group could understand what the New Testament authors had written. In 1966, Good News for Modern Man, a non-literal translation of the New Testament, was released to wide acceptance.  Others followed suit. The Living Bible, released in 1971, was published by its author Kenneth N. Taylor, based on the literal American Standard Version of 1901. Taylor had begun because of the trouble his children had in understanding the literal (and sometimes archaic) text of the King James Bible. His work was at first intended for children, but was later positioned for marketing to high school and college students, as well as adults wishing to better understand the Bible. Like Phillips' version, the Living Bible was a dramatic departure from the King James version.
 
Despite widespread criticism due to being a paraphrase rather than a translation, the popularity of The Living Bible created a demand for a new approach to translating the Bible into contemporary English called dynamic equivalence, which attempts to preserve the meaning of the original text in a readable way. Realizing the immense benefits of a Bible that was more easily accessible to the average reader, and responding to the criticisms of the Living Bible, the American Bible Society extended the Good News for Modern Man to the Good News Bible (1976) by adding the Old Testament, in this more readable style. This translation has gone on to become one of the best selling in history. In 1996, a new revision of Taylor's Living Bible was published. This New Living Translation is a full translation from the original languages rather than a paraphrase of the Bible.

Another project aimed to create something in between the very literal translation of the King James Bible and the more informal Good News Bible. The goal of this was to create a Bible that would be scholarly yet not overly formal. The result of this project was the New International Version (1978). This version became highly popular in Evangelical Protestant circles.

The debate between the formal equivalence and dynamic (or 'functional') equivalence translation styles has increased with the introduction of inclusive language versions. Various terms are employed to defend or attack this development, such as feminist, gender neutral, or gender accurate. New editions of some previous translations have been updated to take this change in language into account, including the New Jerusalem Bible (1985), the New Revised Standard Version (1989), the Revised English Bible (1989), and Today's New International Version (2005). Some translations have approached the issue more cautiously, such as the English Standard Version (2001).

A further process that has assisted in greatly increasing the number of English Bible versions is the use of the Internet in producing virtual bibles, of which a growing number are beginning to appear in print – especially given the development of "print on demand".

Today, there is a range of translations ranging from the most literal, such as the Young's Literal Translation to the most free such as The Message and The Word on the Street.

18th and 19th century translations

20th and 21st century translations

King James Version and derivatives 

The King James Version of 1611 (in its 1769 amended Oxford edition) still has an immense following, and as such there have been a number of different attempts to update or improve upon it. The English Revised Version and its derivatives also stem from the King James Version.

English Revised Version and derivatives 
The English Revised Version was the first official attempt to update the King James Version of 1769. This was adapted in the United States as the American Standard Version. The translations and versions that stem from them are shown in date order:

New International Version and derivatives 
The popular New International Version has appeared in a number of editions.

Dynamic translations and paraphrases 
A significant aspect in translations from the latter half of the 20th century was much greater use of the principles of dynamic equivalence.

Internet-based translations 
The New English Translation (or NET Bible) is a project to publish a translation of the Bible using the Internet. It is freely available and accompanied by extensive translator's notes. Another is The Work of God's Children Illustrated Bible, which uses a collaborative MediaWiki website that interlinks the words of the Bible to articles and image galleries about the topic. The Open English Bible aims to create the first modern public domain English translation of the Bible, using an open-source process for corrections and modernizing verses.

Messianic translations 

Some Bible translations find popular use in, or were prepared especially for, the Messianic Judaism movement.

New English Bible and derivatives 

The initiative to create the New English Bible began in 1946, in an attempt to make an entirely new translation of the Bible in contemporary English.

Public domain translations

Catholic translations 

In addition to the above Catholic English Bibles, all of which have an imprimatur granted by a Catholic bishop, the authors of the Catholic Public Domain Version of 2009 and the 2013 translation from the Septuagint by Jesuit priest Nicholas King refer to them as Catholic Bibles. These versions have not been granted an imprimatur, but do include the Catholic biblical canon of 73 books.

Sacred Name translations 
These Sacred Name Bibles were all done with the specific aim of carrying into English the actual Name of God as they were in the originals. Most have been done by people from the Sacred Name Movement. They are distinguished by their policy of transliterating Hebrew-based forms for sacred names, such as "Yahweh", "YHWH", etc.

Masoretic Text / Jewish translations 

Jewish translations follow the Masoretic Text, and are usually published in bilingual editions with the Hebrew text facing the English translation. The translations often reflect traditional Jewish exegesis of the Bible. As translations of the Masoretic Text, Jewish translations contain neither the apocrypha nor the Christian New Testament.

Septuagint translations

Simplified English Bibles 
There have been a number of attempts to produce a Bible that greatly simplifies the English. (Some of these versions are also listed in other categories: for example, the NIrV is also found under the NIV section). These are translations that are not necessarily a very dynamic translation, but go beyond simply everyday English into a restricted vocabulary set, often aimed at non-native speakers of English.

Translations exclusively published by Jehovah's Witnesses

Translations exclusively published by the Latter Day Saints movement

Adaptive retellings 
Some versions have been labelled "adaptive retelling" as they take many liberties with the form of the text.

Other translations

Partial translations

New Testament

Hebrew Bible

See also 
 Bible translations (for a general overview of translation into many languages)
 Bible errata
 List of English Bible translations
 Jewish English Bible translations
 Bible version debate
 List of Bible verses not included in modern translations
 List of major textual variants in the New Testament
 Bible translations into Broad Scots

Notes

References

Further reading 
 Fundamentalist–Modernist controversy

English, Modern
Bible versions and translations